"N.I.G.G.E.R. (The Slave and the Master)" is a song by rapper Nas from his untitled 2008 studio album. The song contains samples from "We're Just Trying to Make It" by The Persuaders.

The song was nominated for Best Rap Solo Performance at the Grammys on December 3, 2008. 

Nas has a message for the people with this song. Originally, Nas was going to name the entire album "Nigger," but he decided not to despite the racial turmoil of the time, its reflection on the world around him and the need for a reevaluation of the world. Nas ultimately decided to change the album title because of fear of record stores not picking it up. However, his message in the songs remained the same and the name change was just to ensure as many people as possible would still hear that message. And while the album name has changed, the cover art "says nigger real loud."

References

2008 songs
Nas songs
Song recordings produced by DJ Toomp
Songs written by Nas
Songs written by DJ Toomp